Rougefay is a commune in the Pas-de-Calais department in the Hauts-de-France region of France.

Geography

Surrounded by the communes Buire-au-Bois, Haravesnes and Boffles, Rougefay is located 30 km north-east of Abbeville, the largest city nearby.

Population

Places of interest
 The nineteenth century church.
 Saint-Anne's chapel.

See also
Communes of the Pas-de-Calais department

References

Communes of Pas-de-Calais